Euphorbia gaditana is a species of plant native to Spain and Northern Africa. It is an annual plant and reproduces by allogamy.

The species has also been classified as endangered. In Spain, this is due to pesticide application and agriculture.

References 

gaditana